Anthea Williams  is an Australian and New Zealand theatre director, film director, and dramaturg based in Sydney.

Early life 
Williams was born and raised in Christchurch. She is a graduate of the University of New South Wales and the Victorian College of the Arts. She's had chronic rheumatoid arthritis since she was two. She has written the way disability is understood affects her every day, directors have a responsibility to people they represent, and this makes the work better.

Career
Williams was associate director bushfutures at the Bush Theatre from 2007 to 2011. She was associate director new work at Belvoir from 2011 to 2017. She has also worked in development at Causeway Films and Screen Australia. She is presenter for the 2RPH program and podcast Activated Arts.

Works

References

External links
 

Living people
Year of birth missing (living people)
People from Christchurch
University of New South Wales alumni
Victorian College of the Arts alumni
Australian women film directors
Australian film directors
New Zealand women film directors
Artists from Sydney
Women theatre directors